The ASSI Giglio Rosso is an Italian athletics club based in Florence, via Michelangelo nº64.

Achievements
ASSI Giglio Rosso won 5 editions of the women's Italian Championships in Athletics for clubs (Campionati italiani di società di atletica leggera).
5 wins (1931, 1932, 1933, 1934, 1936)

Main athletes
Below are some of the most important athletes in Florentine society.

Men
Arturo Maffei
Bruno Betti
Nello Bartolini
Giuseppe Lippi
Silvano Meconi
Riccardo Fortini
Giacomo Poggi
Alessandro Pezzatini
Gianni Stecchi
Stefano Grazzini
Gianni Japichino
Luca Vandi

Women
Alessandra Becatti

See also
Athletics in Italy

References

External links
 

Athletics clubs in Italy